Nauman Niaz (born 19 November 1969) is a Pakistani television personality, cricket correspondent, and writer. He is currently serving as the Director of Sports & Syndication of the PTVC. He is a recipient of the Tamgha-e-Imtiaz, Pakistan’s Civil Award for his contributions to sports journalism and broadcasting.

Niaz has written articles for various newspapers and has anchored numerous live shows about cricket. He authored Pakistan Cricket The Story of Betrayal (2010) and is the official historian of Pakistan Cricket. His book The Fluctuating Fortunes was commissioned by the Pakistan Cricket Board (PCB) in 2005.

Early life and education
Niaz was born in Lahore, West Pakistan, the third child of Nusrat Hamid and Lieutenant General Hamid Niaz (retd.) of Pakistan Army. He started his schooling in  St Mary’s Academy, Rawalpindi in 1975 before enrolling in Aitchison College, Lahore. After completing his Bachelors in Medicine, and Bachelors in Surgery (MBBS) from the Army Medical College, he worked at the Holy Family Hospital in Rawalpindi. Soon afterwards, Niaz completed his post graduation in endocrinology. He is a member of the Royal College of Physicians and a Fellow of the Royal College of Physicians of Edinburgh. Niaz holds Ph.D. from University of Western Australia and a post doctorate from the University of Oxford.

Cricket career
As a post graduate trainee at the Holy Family Hospital in 1999, he joined the Pakistan Cricket Board as a Media Coordinator and was promoted to Manager Coordinator of the Asian Cricket Council. Soon afterwards, Niaz was appointed as the Pakistan Cricket Board’s media manager.

2021 Shoaib Akhtar spat 
On 28 October 2021, Nauman Niaz was taken off air by the Pakistan Television Corporation (PTV) following a spat on the popular show Game on Hai with former fast bowler Shoaib Akhtar. Niaz later expressed regret, saying, "I had no right. To err is human and for that, I apologize. Not only once, but a million times. Shoaib has been a rock star. Whatever happened on camera was unbecoming."

References

1969 births
Living people
Cricket historians and writers
People from Lahore
Pakistani sports journalists
Pakistani cricket commentators
Pakistani endocrinologists
Aitchison College alumni
University of Western Australia alumni